Nearly all primary and secondary schools in the province of Nova Scotia are public schools maintained by the provincial government's Department of Education.  While providing guidelines, the government divides administration of public education over seven regional school districts and one province wide school district serving the province's Acadians.

Post-secondary schools consist of the provincial government operated community college system, Nova Scotia Community College and independently managed universities which receive some public funding.  (For a list of post-secondary institutions see List of colleges and universities in Nova Scotia.)

There are seven English-language school districts in Nova Scotia: 
Annapolis Valley Regional Centre for Education
Cape Breton - Victoria Regional Centre for Education
Chignecto - Central Regional Centre for Education
Halifax Regional Centre for Education
South Shore Regional Centre for Education
Strait Regional Centre for Education
Tri-County Regional Centre for Education

There is a single province-wide French school district:
Conseil scolaire acadien provincial

Description of Nova Scotia public grade schools
A high school in Nova Scotia has typically meant a 'senior high school', referring to a school responsible for the education of students grades 10 to (and including) 12 or grades 9 to 12.  A junior high school is typically responsible for grades 7 to 9 or grades 6 to 8, where the latter type is more often called a middle school.   Some rural high schools combine junior and senior high schools, providing education for grades 7 to 12.

An elementary school is responsible for the education of students from grade kindergarten (usually referred to in Nova Scotia as "grade primary") or grade 1 to grade 5 or 6.  A number of Nova Scotian schools combine elementary or the later grades of elementary with junior high or the earlier grades of junior high to form what is referred to as a consolidated school.  (Note: The term 'consolidated' is also confusingly used in the naming of a few elementary schools too in the province).  Finally, a few schools have all grades from kindergarten to 12.

In summary prominent patterns by which Nova Scotian grade school students attend school are as follows:
1)elementary school, grades pr to 6; junior high school, grades 7 to 9; high school, 10 to 12 
2)elementary school, grades pr to 5; middle school, grades 6 to 8; high school, 9 to 12
3)elementary school, grades pr to 6; junior and senior high school 7 to 12
4)consolidated school, grades pr to 9; high school, 10 to 12
5)elementary school, grades pr to 4; consolidated school, grades 5 to 9; high school, grades 10 to 12.

List of Nova Scotia public grade schools
The following are all the public schools in Nova Scotia listed according to the board by which they are managed, and by county.  The numbers provided (in parentheses) refer to the grades of each school, where "pr" refers to primary = kindergarten and "to" entails "including".  Next to the grades is given the community each school in located in.

Annapolis Valley Regional Centre for Education

Annapolis County
Annapolis East Elementary School (pr to 5); 325 Marshall Street, Middleton
Annapolis Royal Regional Academy (6 to 8); 590 George Street, Annapolis Royal
Annapolis West Education Centre (9 to 12); 100 Champlain Drive, Annapolis Royal
Bridgetown Regional Elementary School (pr to 6); 7 Park Street, Bridgetown
Bridgetown Regional High School (7 to 12); 456 Granville Street, Bridgetown
Champlain Elementary School (pr to 5); 109 North Street, Granville
Clark Rutherford Memorial School (pr to 5); 63 Spinnaker Drive, Cornwallis
Lawrencetown Consolidated School (pr to 6); 10 Middle Road, Lawrencetown
Middleton Regional High School (6 to 12); 18 Gates Avenue, Middleton

Kings County

Aldershot Elementary School (pr to 5); 446 Aldershot Road, Kentville
Berwick & District School (pr to 9); 220 Veterans Drive, Berwick
Cambridge & District Elementary School (pr to 6); 6113 Trunk 1, Cambridge Station
Central Kings Rural High School (7 to 12); Cambridge Station
Coldbrook & District School (pr to 8); 2305 English Mountain Road, Coldbrook
Dwight Ross School (pr to 5); Greenwood
Evangeline Middle School (6 to 8); New Minas
Gaspareau Valley Elementary School (pr to 5); 2459 Greenfield Road, Wolfville
Glooscap Elementary School (pr to 5); 1017 J. Jordan Road, Canning
Hantsport School (pr to 9); 11 School Street, Hantsport
Highbury Education Centre (10 and 11); 1042 Highbury Road, New Minas
Horton High School (9 to 12); 75 Greenwich Road South, Wolfville
Kings County Academy (pr to 5); 25 School Street, Kentville
Kingston District School (pr to 5); 630 Pine Ridge Avenue, Kingston
L.E. Shaw Elementary School (pr to 6); 486 Oak Island Road, Avonport
New Minas Elementary School (pr to 5); 34 Jones Road, New Minas
Northeast Kings Education Centre (6 to 12); 1816 Bains Road, Canning
Pine Ridge Middle School (6 to 8); 625 Pine Ridge Avenue, Kingston
Port Williams Elementary School (pr to 5); 1261 Belcher Street, Port Williams
Somerset & District Elementary School (pr to 6); 4339 Brooklyn Street, Berwick
St. Mary's Elementary School (pr to 5); 1276 Victoria Road, Aylesford
West Kings District High School (9 to 12); 1941 Trunk 1, Auburn
Wolfville School (pr to 8); 19 Acadia Street, Wolfville

West Hants Municipality
Avon View High School (10 to 12); 225 Payzant Drive, Windsor
Brooklyn District Elementary School (pr to 6); 8008 Trunk 14, Newport
Dr. Arthur Hines Elementary School (pr to 6); 75 Musgrave Road, Summerville
Falmouth District Elementary School (pr to 6); 30 School Road, Falmouth
Newport Station District Elementary School (pr to 6); 1989 Wentworth Road, Newport
Three Mile Plains School (pr to 5); 4555 Trunk 1, Three Mile Plains
West Hants Middle School (6 to 8); 8009 Trunk 14, Newport
Windsor Elementary School (pr to 6); 100 Tremaine Crescent, Windsor
Windsor Forks District Elementary School (pr to 6); 120 Sangster Bridge Road, Curry's Corner

Cape Breton - Victoria Regional Centre for Education

Cape Breton Regional Municipality
Bras d'Or Elementary School (pr to 5); 10 Alder Point Road, Bras d'Or
Breton Education Centre (6 to 12); 667 Eighth Street, New Waterford 
Brookland Elementary School (pr to 5); 153 Cottage Road, Sydney
CBVRSB Adult High (adults only); 290 Whitney Avenue, Sydney
Coxheath Elementary School (pr to 5); 30 Mount Florence Street, Coxheath
Cusack Elementary School (p to 5); 500 Birch Hill Drive, Sydney
Donkin-Gowrie Complex (p to 8); 81 Centre Avenue, Donkin
Dr. T.L Sullivan School (p to 8); 256 Park Road, Florence
Glace Bay Elementary School (p to 5); 135 Brookside Street, Glace Bay
Glace Bay High School (9 to 12); 201 Reserve Street, Glace Bay
Greenfield Elementary School (pr to 5); 25 James Street, New Waterford
Harbourside Elementary School (pr to 5); 15 Church Street, Sydney
John Bernard Croak V.C. Memorial School (pr to 5); 10 Second Street, Glace Bay
Jubilee Elementary School (pr to 5); 755 Main Street, Sydney Mines
Malcolm Munroe Middle School (6 to 8); 125 Kenwood Drive, Sydney River
Marion Bridge Elementary School (pr to 5); 3845 Gabarus Highway, Marion Bridge
Memorial Senior High School (9 to 12); 80 Memorial Drive, Sydney Mines
Mountainview Elementary School (p to 5); 21 Delta Drive (6295), Howie Centre
Oceanview Education Centre (6 to 8); 60 Wallaces Road, Glace Bay
Riverside Elementary School (pr to 5); 7430 Hornes Road, Albert Bridge
Riverview Rural High School (10 to 12); 57 Coxheath Road, Coxheath
Robin Foote Elementary School (pr to 5); 125 Sunnydale Drive, Westmount
Seton Elementary School (pr to 5); 25 Wilkie Dr, North Sydney
Sherwood Park Education Centre (6 to 8); 500 Terrace Street, Sydney
Shipyard Elementary School (pr to 5); 30 Mount Kemmel, Sydney
St. Anne's Elementary School (pr to 5); 108 Main Street, Glace Bay
Sydney Academy (9 to 12); 49 Terrace Street, Sydney
Sydney Mines Middle School (6 to 8); 596 Main Street, Sydney Mines
Sydney River Elementary School (pr to 5); 35 Phillips Street, Sydney River
Tompkins Memorial Elementary School (pr to 5); 60 Main Street, Reserve Mines
Whitney Pier Memorial Middle School (6 to 8); 199 Jamieson Street, Sydney

Victoria County

Baddeck Academy (pr to 12); Post Office Box 310, Baddeck
Boularderie Elementary School (pr to 6); 12065 Kempt Road, Boularderie Island
Cabot Education Centre (7 to 12); 32039 Cabot Trail, Neil's Harbour
Cape Smokey Elementary School (pr to 6); 39 Brandon Lane, Ingonish
Middle River Consolidated School (pr to 6); 2248 Cabot Trail, Middle River
North Highlands Elementary School (pr to 6); 1363 Bay Street Lawrence, Aspy Bay
Rankin School of the Narrows (pr to 12); 4144 Highway 223, Iona

Chignecto-Central Regional Centre for Education

Pictou County (Celtic)
A.G. Baillie Memorial School (pr to 6); New Glasgow
Acadia Street School (pr to 6); New Glasgow
Adult High School - New Glasgow Area (adults only); New Glasgow

Dr. W.A. MacLeod Elementary School (pr to 6); Stellarton
East Pictou Middle School (7 to 9); Thorburn
F.H. MacDonald Elementary School (pr to 6); Thorburn
G.R. Saunders Elementary School (pr to 5); Stellarton
Highland Consolidated Middle School (7 to 8); Westville
New Glasgow Junior High School (7 to 9); New Glasgow
North Nova Education Centre (10 to 12); New Glasgow
Northumberland Regional High School (9 to 12); Westville
Pictou Academy (7 to 12); Pictou
McCulloch Education Centre (pr to 6); Pictou
River John Consolidated School (pr to 9); River John
Salt Springs Elementary School (pr to 5); Salt Springs
Scotsburn Elementary School (pr to 5); Scotsburn
Temperance Street School (pr to 6); New Glasgow
Thorburn Consolidated School (pr to 9); Thorburn
Trenton Elementary School (pr to 4); Trenton
Trenton Middle School (5 to 9); Trenton
Walter Duggan Consolidated School (pr to 6); Westville
West Pictou Consolidated School (pr to 8); Outside of Pictou

Cumberland County (Chignecto)
Advocate District School (pr to 12); Advocate Harbour
Amherst Regional High School (9 to 12); Amherst
Cumberland North Academy (pr to 6); Brookdale
Cyrus Eaton Elementary School (pr to 6); Pugwash
E.B. Chandler Junior High School (7 to 8); Amherst
Junction Road Elementary School (pr to 6); Springhill
Northport Consolidated Elementary School (pr to 6); Northport
Oxford Regional Education Centre (pr to 12); Oxford
Parrsboro Regional Elementary School (pr to 6); Parrsboro
Parrsboro Regional High School (7 to 12); Parrsboro
Pugwash District High School (7 to 12); Pugwash
River Hebert District School (P to 12); River Hebert
Springhill Junior/Senior High School (7 to 12); Springhill
Spring Street Academy (pr to 6); Amherst
Wallace Consolidated Elementary School (pr to 6); Wallace
Wentworth Consolidated Elementary School (pr to 6); Wentworth
West End Memorial School (pr to 6); Springhill
West Highlands Elementary School (pr to 6); Amherst

Central and Northern Colchester County (Cobequid)
Adult High School - Truro Area (10 to 12); Salmon River
Alice Street Elementary School (pr to 5); Truro **CLOSED**
Bass River Elementary School (pr to 3); Bass River
Bible Hill Central Elementary School (pr to 4); Bible Hill
Bible Hill East Court Road Elementary School (pr to 4); Bible Hill
Bible Hill Junior High School (8 to 9); Bible Hill
Central Colchester Junior High School (6 to 9); Truro
Chiganois Elementary School (pr to 5); Masstown
Cobequid Consolidated Elementary School (pr to 5); Old Barns
Cobequid Educational Centre (9 to 12); Truro
Debert Elementary School (pr to 6); Debert
Douglas Street Elementary School (pr to 5); Truro
Great Village Elementary School (pr to 4); Great Village
Harmony Heights Elementary School (pr to 5); Salmon River
North Colchester High School (7 to 12); Tatamagouche **CLOSED**
North River Elementary School (pr to 6); North River
Princess Margaret Rose Elementary School (pr to 5); Truro
Redcliff Middle School (5 to 7); Truro
Brookfield Memorial Elementary School (pr to 6); Brookfield
Salmon River Elementary School (pr to 4); Salmon River **CLOSED**
St. Mary's Elementary School (pr to 5); Truro
Tatamagouche Elementary School (pr to 6); Tatamagouche
Truro Junior High School (5 to 8); Truro
Valley Elementary School (pr to 4); Salmon River
West Colchester Consolidated School (4 to 9); Bass River
Willow Street Elementary School (pr to 5); Truro

East Hants Municipal District and southern Colchester County (Nova)
Adult High School - Elmsdale Area (adults only); Elmsdale
Cobequid District Elementary School (pr to 6); Noel
Elmsdale District Elementary School (pr to 5); Elmsdale
Enfield District Elementary School (pr to 5); Enfield
Hants East Rural High School (9 to 12); Milford Station
Hants North Rural High School (9 to 12); Kennetcook
Hilden Elementary School (pr to 6); Hilden
Kennetcook District Elementary School (pr to 6); Kennetcook
Maitland District Elementary School (pr to 6); Maitland
Maple Ridge Elementary School (pr to 5); Lantz
Rawdon District Elementary School (pr to 6); Upper Rawdon
Riverside Education Centre (6 to 8); Milford
Shubenacadie District Elementary School (pr to 5); Shubenacadie
South Colchester Academy (7 to 12); Brookfield
Uniacke District School (pr to 9); Mount Uniacke
Upper Stewiacke Elementary School (pr to 6); Upper Stewiacke
Winding River Consolidated Elementary School (pr to 6); Stewiacke

Halifax Regional Centre for Education - Halifax Regional Municipality

Eastern Shore - Musquodoboit Valley
Dutch Settlement Elementary School (pr to 6) Dutch Settlement
Musquodoboit Valley Education Centre (pr to 6); 12046 Route 224, Middle Musquodoboit
Oyster Pond Academy (pr to 9);  Jeddore Oyster Ponds
Upper Musquodoboit Consolidated School (pr to 6); 8416 Route 224, Upper Musquodoboit
Marine Drive Academy (pr to 12); 481 Church Point Road, Sheet Harbour
Musquodoboit Rural High School (7 to 12); 11976 Route 224, Middle Musquodoboit
Eastern Shore District High School (10 to 12); Musquodoboit Harbour
Former Schools in the Eastern Shore - Musquodoboit Valley Region:
Sheet Harbour Consolidated School (pr to 6); 479 Church Point Road, Sheet Harbour
Lakefront Consolidated Elementary School (pr to 6); 17286 Marine Dr, Tangier
Eastern Consolidated Elementary School (pr to 6) ; 28875 Marine Dr,  Moser River
Musquodoboit Elementary School ; 7962 Nova Scotia Trunk 7, Musquodoboit Harbour
Jeddore Lakeville School ; 47 E Jeddore Rd, Head of Jeddore
Robert Jamison School ; 10583 Highway 7, Oyster Pond
Harbourside School ; Owls Head

Waverley - Fall River - Beaver Bank - Bedford
Ash Lee Jefferson Elementary School (pr to 6); 10 Lockview Rd, Fall River
Basinview Drive Community Elementary School (pr to 6); 273 Basinview Dr, Bedford
Beaver Bank-Kinsac Elementary School (pr to 6); 28 Kinsac Rd, Kinsac
Beaver Bank-Monarch Drive Elementary School (pr to 6); 1 Monarch Dr, Beaver Bank
Holland Road Elementary School (pr to 6); 181 Holland Rd, Fletchers Lake
Lake Charles Academy (private grade primary); 955 Waverley Rd, Waverley
Oldfield Consolidated School (pr to 6)
Sunnyside Elementary School (Eaglewood Drive) (pr to 6); 210 Eaglewood Dr, Bedford
Sunnyside Elementary School (Fort Sackville) (pr to 6); 21 Perth St, Bedford
Sunnyside Elementary School (Waverley Road) (pr to 6); 18 Scotia Dr, Bedford
Waverley Memorial - L. C. Skerry Elementary School (Waverly Memorial) (pr to 6); 15 School St, Waverley
Waverley Memorial - L. C. Skerry Elementary School (L.C. Skerry) (pr to 6); 1279 Rocky Lake Dr, Waverley
Bedford South School (pr to 6); 2 Oceanview Dr, Bedford
Broad Street PP-8 School, 50 Broad St, West Bedford (opening September 2023)
Rocky Lake Elementary School (5 to 6); 426 Rocky Lake Dr, Bedford
Rocky Lake Junior High School (6 to 9); 670 Rocky Lake Dr, Bedford
Georges P. Vanier Junior High School (7 to 8); 1410 Fall River Dr, Fall River
Harold T. Barrett Junior High School (7 to 9); 862 Beaverbank Rd, Beaver Bank
Lockview High School (9 to 12); 148 Lockview Rd, Fall River
Charles P Allen High School (10 to 12); 200 Innovation Dr, Bedford
Broad Street High School, 50 Broad St, West Bedford (opening September 2023)

Preston - Lawrencetown - Chezzetcook
Atlantic View Elementary School (pr to 6); 3391 Marine Dr, Upper Lawrencetown
Bell Park Academic Centre (pr to 6)
Lakeview Consolidated School (Lakeview) (pr to 6); 5261 Trunk 7, Dartmouth ***CLOSED***
Lakeview Consolidated School (West Chezzetcook) (pr to 6); 7045 Route 207, West Chezzetcook ***CLOSED***
Nelson Whynder Elementary School (pr to 6); Lake Major Rd & Cain St, North Preston
O'Connell Drive Elementary School (pr to 6); Porters Lake
Porters Lake Elementary School (P-6); (40 Inspiration Drive, Porters Lake, Nova Scotia)
Gaetz Brook Junior High School (7 to 9); 6856 Trunk 7, Head of Chezzetcook
Graham Creighton Junior High School (7 to 9); 72 Cherry Brook Rd, Cherry Brook

Cole Harbour - Woodside - Eastern Passage
Astral Drive Elementary School (pr to 6); 236 Astral Dr, Dartmouth
Caldwell Road Elementary School (pr to 6); 280 Caldwell Rd, Dartmouth
Colby Village Elementary School (pr to 6); 92 Colby Dr, Dartmouth
Colonel John Stuart Elementary School (pr to 6); 5 John Stewart Dr, Dartmouth
George Bissett Elementary School (pr to 6); 170 Arklow Dr, Dartmouth
Humber Park Elementary School (pr to 6); 5 Smallwood Ave, Dartmouth
Joseph Giles Elementary School (pr to 6); 54 Gregory Dr, Dartmouth
Ocean View Elementary School (pr to 4); 51 Oceanview School Rd, Eastern Passage
Robert Kemp Turner Elementary School (pr to 6); 141 Circassion Dr, Dartmouth
Seaside Elementary School (4 French Immersion, 5 to 6); 1881 Caldwell Rd, Eastern Passage
Sir Robert Borden Junior High School (7 to 9); 16 Evergreen Dr, Dartmouth
South Woodside Elementary School (pr to 6); 5 Everette St, Dartmouth
Southdale-North Woodside School (pr to 6); 36 Hastings Dr, Dartmouth
Tallahassee Community School (pr to 4); 168 Redoubt Way, Eastern Passage
Astral Drive Junior High School (7 to 9); 238 Astral Dr, Dartmouth
Eastern Passage Education Centre (7 to 9); 93 Samual Daniel Dr, Eastern Passage
Cole Harbour District High School (10 to 12); 2 Chameau Cres, Dartmouth

East Dartmouth - The Lakes - Portland - East Woodlawn
Admiral Westphal Elementary School (pr to 6); 6 Fourth St, Dartmouth
Auburn Drive High School (10 to 12); 300 Auburn Dr, Dartmouth
Bel Ayr Elementary School (pr to 6); 4 Bell St, Dartmouth
Brookhouse Elementary School (pr to 6); 15 Christopher Ave, Woodlawn, Dartmouth
Ian Forsyth Elementary School (pr to 6); 22 Glencoe Dr, Dartmouth
Michael Wallace Elementary School (pr to 6); 24 Andover St, Port Wallace, Dartmouth
Mount Edward Elementary School (pr to 6); 3 Windward Ave, Dartmouth
Portland Estates Elementary School (pr to 6); 45 Portland Hills Dr, Portland Estates, Dartmouth
Prince Andrew High School (10 to 12); 37 Woodlawn Rd, Woodlawn, Dartmouth
Ross Road School (pr to 9); 336 Ross Road, Westphal, Dartmouth
Caledonia Junior High School (7 to 9); 38 Caledonia Rd, Westphal, Dartmouth
Ellenvale Junior High School (7 to 9); 88 Belle Vista Dr, Woodlawn, Dartmouth
Eric Graves Memorial Junior High School (7 to 9); 70 Dorothea Dr, Woodlawn,  Dartmouth

Dartmouth Centre - Albro Lake- Harbourview
Alderney School (pr to 6); 2 Penhorn Dr, Dartmouth
Crichton Park School (pr to 6); 49 Lyngby Ave, Dartmouth
Harbour View Elementary School (pr to 6); 25 Alfred St, Dartmouth
Hawthorn Elementary School (pr to 6); 10 Hawthorne, Dartmouth
John MacNeil Elementary School (pr to 6); 62 Leamon Dr, Dartmouth
Bicentennial School (pr to 9); 85 Victoria Rd, Dartmouth
John Martin Junior High School (7 to 9); 7 Brule St, Dartmouth
Dartmouth High School (10 to 12); 95 Victoria Rd, Dartmouth

Clayton Park West - Fairview - Clayton Park - Rockingham - Wentworth
Burton Ettinger School (pr to 6); 52 Alex St, Halifax
Duc d'Anville Elementary School (pr to 6); 12 Clayton Park Dr, Halifax
Fairview Heights School (pr to 6); 210 Coronation Ave, Halifax
Grosvenor-Wentworth Park Elementary School (pr to 6); 4 Downing St, Halifax
Rockingham Elementary School (pr to 6); 31 Tremont Dr, Halifax
Park West School (pr to 9); 206 Langbrae Dr, Halifax*Clayton Park Junior High School (7 to 9); 45 Plateau Cr, Halifax
Fairview Junior High School (7 to 9); 155 Rosedale Ave, Halifax
Halifax West High School (10 to 12); 283 Thomas Raddall Dr, Halifax
Clayton Park Junior High (7 to 9); 45 Plateau Crescent, Halifax

North End Halifax - Downtown Halifax
Joseph Howe Elementary School (pr to 6); 2557 Maynard St, Halifax
Saint Mary's Elementary School (pr to 6); 5614 Morris St, Halifax
St. Catherine's Elementary School (pr to 6); 3299 Connolly St, Halifax
St. Joseph's - Alexander McKay Elementary School (pr to 6); 5389 Russell St, Halifax
St. Stephen's Elementary School (pr to 6); 3669 Highland Ave, Halifax
St. Patrick's - Alexandra School (pr to 9); 2277 Maitland St, Halifax
 Highland Park Junior High School (7 to 9); 3479 Robie St, Halifax
Citadel High School (10 to 12); 1855 Trollope St, Halifax
Ecole Oxford School (pr to 9); 6364 North St, Halifax

Northwest Arm - South End - Connaught - Quinpool
Inglis Street Elementary School (pr to 6); 5985 Inglis St, Halifax
LeMarchant-St. Thomas Elementary School (pr to 6); 6141 Watt St, Halifax
Sir Charles Tupper School (pr to 6); 1930 Cambridge St, Halifax
Westmount Elementary School (pr to 6); 6900 Edward Arab Ave, Armdale
Oxford School (pr to 9); 6364 North St, Halifax
Halifax Central Junior High School (7 to 9); 1787 Preston St, Halifax
Gorsebrook Junior High School (7 to 9); 5966 South St, Halifax
St. Agnes Junior High School (7 to 9); 6981 Mumford Rd, Armdale

Purcell's Cove - Armdale - Spryfield - Herring Cove
Central Spryfield School (pr to 6); 364 Herring Cove Rd, Spryfield
Chebucto Heights Elementary School  (pr to 6); 230 Cowie Rd, Armdale
Harrietsfield Elementary School (pr to 6); 1150 Old Sambro Rd, Harrietsfield
John W. MacLeod - Fleming Tower Elementary School (Fleming Tower) (pr to 6); 25 Randolph St, Armdale
John W. MacLeod - Fleming Tower Elementary School (John W MacLeod) (pr to 6); 159 Purcells Cove Rd, Armdale
Sambro Elementary School (pr to 6) Sambro
Springvale Elementary School (pr to 6); 92 Downs Ave, Halifax
William King Elementary School (pr to 6); 91 St. Paul Ave, Herring Cove
Elizabeth Sutherland School (pr to 9); 66 Rockingstone Rd, Halifax
Rockingstone Heights School (pr to 9); 1 Regan Dr, Halifax
Cunard Junior High School (7 to 9); 121 Williams Lake Rd, Spryfield
Herring Cove Junior High (7 to 9); 7 Lancaster Dr, Herring Cove
J.L.Ilsley High School (10 to 12); 38 Sylvia Ave, Spryfield

Timberlea - Prospect - Hammonds Plains - St. Margaret's
Atlantic Memorial - Terence Bay Elementary School (pr to 5); 3591 Prospect Rd, Shad Bay
Beechville Lakeside Timberlea Elementary School (pr to 5); 24 James St, Timberlea
East St. Margarets Elementary School (pr to 6); 8671 Peggys Cove Rd, Indian Harbour
Hammonds Plains Consolidated School (pr to 5); 2180 Hammonds Plains Rd, Upper Hammonds Plains
Kingswood Elementary School (pr to 6); 34 Vrege Ct, Kingswood Subdivision, Upper Hammonds Plains
Prospect Road Elementary School (pr to 6); 2199 Prospect Rd, Prospect
Shatford Memorial Elementary School (pr to 6); 10089 St. Margaret's Bay Rd, Hubbards
St. Margaret's Bay Elementary School (pr to 6); 24 Ridgewood Dr, Head of St Margarets Bay
Tantallon Elementary School (pr to 6); 1 French Village Station Rd, Upper Tantallon
Brookside Junior High School (6 to 9); 2239 Prospect Rd, Prospect
Madeline Symonds Middle School (6 to 9); 290 White Hills Rd, Upper Hammonds Plains
Ridgecliff Middle School (6 to 9); 35 Beech Tree Run, Beechville
Tantallon Junior High School (7 to 9); 3 French Village Station Rd, Upper Tantallon
Bay View High School (HRM) (10 to 12); 31 Scholars Rd, Upper Tantallon, Nova Scotia

Middle & Upper Sackville - Lucasville - Lower Sackville
Caudle Park Elementary School (pr to 6); 35 Magee Dr, Lower Sackville
Gertrude M. Parker Elementary School (pr to 6); 100 Stokil Dr, Lower Sackville
Harry R. Hamilton Elementary School (pr to 6); 40 Hamilton Dr, Middle Sackville
Hillside Park Elementary School (pr to 6); 15 Hillside Ave, Lower Sackville
Millwood Elementary School (pr to 6); 190 Beaverbank Cross Rd, Lower Sackville
Newbridge Academy (pr to 9); 409 Glendale Dr, Lower Sackville

Sackville Heights Elementary School (pr to 6); 1225 Old Sackville Rd, Middle Sackville
Smokey Drive Elementary School (pr to 6); 241 Smokey Dr, Lower Sackville
Sycamore Lane Elementary School (pr to 6); 69 Sycomore Ln, Lower Sackville
Cavalier Drive School (pr to 9); 116 Cavalier Dr, Lower Sackville
A.J. Smeltzer Junior High School (7 to 9); 46 Prince St, Lower Sackville
Leslie Thomas Junior High School (7 to 9); 100 Metropolitan Ave, Lower Sackville
Sackville Heights Junior High School (7 to 9); 956 Sackville Dr, Lower Sackville
Millwood High School (10 to 12); 141 Millwood Dr, Lower Sackville
Sackville High School (10 to 12); 1 King Fisher Way, Lower Sackville

South Shore Regional Centre for Education

Lunenburg County

Aspotogan Consolidated Elementary School (pr to 5); Hubbards
Bayview Community School (pr to 9); Mahone Bay
Big Tancook Elementary School (pr to 5); Big Tancook Island
Bluenose Academy (pr to 9); Lunenburg
Bridgewater Elementary School (pr to 6); Bridgewater
Bridgewater Junior High School (7 to 9); Bridgewater
Chester Area Middle School (6 to 9); Chester
Chester District Elementary School (pr to 5);  Chester
Forest Heights Community School (10 to 12); Chester
Gold River-Western Shore Elementary School (pr to 5); Western Shore
Hebbville Academy (pr to 9); Bridgewater
Lunenburg Adult High School (adults only); Bridgewater
Mahone Bay Centre (alternate and transition); Mahone Bay
New Germany Elementary School (pr to 6); New Germany
New Germany Rural High School (7 to 12); New Germany
New Ross Consolidated School (pr to 9); New Ross
Newcombville Elementary School (pr to 4); Bridgewater
Park View Education Centre (10 to 12); Bridgewater
Pentz Elementary School (pr to 6); LaHave
Petite Rivière Elementary School (pr to 6); Petite Rivière
South Shore Alternate School (10 to 12); Bridgewater
Verge House Transition Program School (10 to 12); Bridgewater
West Northfield Elementary School (pr to 6);  Bridgewater

Region of Queens Municipality
Dr. John C. Wickwire Academy (2 to 6); Liverpool
Gorham Memorial Education Centre (adult, transition and alternate); Liverpool
Greenfield Elementary School (pr to 6); Greenfield
Liverpool Regional High School (10 to 12); Liverpool
Mill Village Consolidated Elementary School (pr to 6); Mill Village
Milton Centennial School (pr to 1); Milton
North Queens Elementary School (pr to 6); Caledonia (destroyed by fire 2006-09-14)
North Queens Community High School (7 to 12); Caledonia
Queens Adult High School (adults only); Liverpool
South Queens Junior High School (7 to 9); Liverpool

Strait Regional School Board

Inverness County
Pleasant Bay School (pr to 6); Pleasant Bay
Cape Breton Highlands Education Centre/Academy (pr to 12); Terre Noire
Inverness Academy (pr to 12); Inverness
Dalbrae Academy (9 to 12); Southwest Mabou
Bayview Education Centre (pr to 8); Port Hood
Whycocomagh Education Centre (pr to 8); Whycocomagh
SAERC (9 to 12); Port Hawkesbury
Tamarac Education Centre (pr to 8); Port Hawkesbury

Richmond County
East Richmond Education Centre (pr to 8); St. Peter's
Felix Marchand Education Centre (pr to 4); Louisdale
Richmond Academy (9 to 12); Louisdale

Antigonish County
East Antigonish Education Centre/Academy (pr to 12); Monastery
Rev. H.J. MacDonald School (pr to 6); Heatherton
St. Andrew's Consolidated School (pr to 6); St. Andrew's
Dr. J.H. Gillis Regional School (9 to 12);  Antigonish
Antigonish Education Centre (pr to 4); Antigonish
St. Andrew Junior School (5 to 8); Antigonish
H.M. MacDonald Elementary School (pr to 6);  Antigonish

Guysborough County
Mulgrave Memorial Education Centre (pr to 8); Mulgrave
Chedabucto Place (pr to 12); Guysborough
Fanning Education Centre (pr to 12); Hazel Hill
St. Mary's Education Centre / Academy (pr to 12); Sherbrooke

Tri-County Regional School Board

Digby County
Barton Consolidated School (pr to 6) *CLOSED*; Barton
Digby Adult High School (adults only); Digby
Digby Elementary School (pr to 6); Digby
Digby Neck Consolidated School (pr to 6); Digby Neck
Digby Regional High School (7 to 12); Digby
Islands Consolidated School (pr to 12); Freeport
St Mary's Bay Academy (7 to 12); Weymouth
Weymouth Consolidated School (pr to 6); Weymouth

Yarmouth County
Carleton Consolidated School (pr to 6); Carleton
Drumlin Heights Consolidated School (pr to 12); Glenwood
Maple Grove Education Centre (7 to 8); Hebron
Meadowfields Community School (pr to 6); Yarmouth
Plymouth School (pr to 6); Plymouth
Port Maitland Consolidated Elementary School (pr to 6); Port Maitland
Yarmouth Adult High School (adults only); Yarmouth
Yarmouth Central Elementary School (pr to 6); Yarmouth
Yarmouth Consolidated Memorial High School (9 to 12); Yarmouth

Shelburne County
Barrington Municipal High School (7 to 12); Barrington
Cape Sable Island Elementary School (3 to 6); Cape Sable Island
Clark's Harbour Elementary School (pr to 3); Clark's Harbour
Evelyn Richardson Elementary School (pr to 6); Shag Harbour
Forest Ridge Academy (pr to 6); Barrington
Hillcrest Academy (pr to 6); Shelburne
Lockeport Elementary School (pr to 6); Lockeport
Lockeport Regional High School (7 to 12); Lockeport
Shelburne Regional High School (7 to 12); Shelburne

Conseil scolaire acadien provincial

Région Nord-Est
Centre scolaire Étoile de l'Acadie (pr to 12); Sydney
École acadienne de Pomquet (pr to 12); Pomquet
École Beau-Port (pr to 12); Arichat
École NDA (pr to 12); Chéticamp

Région Centrale
École acadienne de Truro (pr to 12); Truro
École Beaubassin (pr to 5); Halifax
École Bois-Joli (pr to 6); Dartmouth
Centre Scolaire de la Rive-Sud (pr to 12); Blockhouse
École du Carrefour (7 to 12); Dartmouth
École Rose-des-Vents (pr to 12); Greenwood
École secondaire du Sommet (6 to 12); Halifax

Région Sud-Ouest
École Belleville (pr to 6); Tusket
École Jean-Marie-Gay (pr to 6); Saulnierville
École Joseph-Dugas (pr to 6); Church Point
École Pubnico-Ouest (pr to 6); West Pubnico
École Saint-Albert (pr to 6); Salmon River
École secondaire de Clare (7 to 12); Meteghan River
École secondaire de Par-en-Bas (7 to 12); Tusket
École Stella-Maris (pr to 6); Meteghan
École Wedgeport (pr to 6); Wedgeport

List of Nova Scotia private schools
The following are private schools in Nova Scotia. The numbers provided (in parentheses) refer to the grades of each school, where "pr" refers to primary = kindergarten, “jp” refers to junior primary and "to" entails "including".  Next to the grades is given the community in which each school is located.

Armbrae Academy (pr to 12); Halifax
Bedford Academy; Bedford, Nova Scotia
Birch Hills Academy (pr to 7); Bedford
Bridgeway Academy (ages 5–19)
Churchill Academy ; Dartmouth, Nova Scotia
Colchester Christian Academy (K4 to 12); Truro, Nova Scotia
Creative Kids Education Centre (pr to 5); Hammonds Plains, Nova Scotia
Halifax Christian Academy (pre-pr to 12); Halifax, Nova Scotia
Halifax Grammar School (pr to 12); Halifax
Halifax Independent School (pr to 9); Halifax, Nova Scotia
Harbourview Montessori School (preK to 8); Sydney, Nova Scotia
Kings View Academy (7 to 12) ;
Kings Edgehill School (7 to 12); Windsor
Kingston Bible College Academy (pr to 12); Freeman Dr, Kingston
Landmark East School (ages 11–18): Wolfville, Nova Scotia
Maritime Muslim Academy (pr to 12); Halifax, Nova Scotia
The Booker School (k to 8); Port Williams, Nova Scotia
Newbridge Academy (pr to 9); Sackville, Nova Scotia
Oceanview Christian Academy (pr to 9); Cape Sable Island, Nova Scotia
Sacred Heart School of Halifax (pr to 12); Halifax
Sandy Lake Academy (pr to 12); Bedford
Shambhala School (pr to 12); Halifax
Silver Crescent Academy (ESL/Child Care/primary to 10); Halifax, Nova Scotia
South Shore Waldorf School (pr to 6); Blockhouse, Nova Scotia
Summit Academy of Active Learning (jp to 9);Bedford, Nova Scotia
Via Vita Academy of Learning (preK to 9), Lower Sackville, Nova Scotia

See also
List of school districts in Nova Scotia
List of schools in Canada

References

External links
Regional School Boards & Education Offices, Nova Scotia Department of Education
 Nova Scotia schools online Links to school websites

Nova Scotia

Education in Nova Scotia
Schools